Calvin Coolidge Lytle (January 24, 1924 – January 26, 1990), better known by his professional names Bert Lytell and Chocolate Kid, was an American boxer and middleweight contender in the 1940s and early 1950s. Recognized as a member of the famous Murderers' Row, the 5'8" Lytell fought (and often won) against other top black middleweights of his time, including Charley Burley, Herbert "Cocoa Kid" Lewis Hardwick, Holman Williams, and Charley Doc Williams, as well as other notable fighters including Archie Moore and Sam Baroudi.

Like many of his contemporaries, Bert Lytell was denied a chance to fight for a world title largely due to his race.

Lytell was born in Victoria, Texas. He enlisted in the Naval reserves in 1942 in San Antonio, Texas, and was discharged in 1944. He resided in New York City for most of his career, later moving to Oakland, California to be closer to his family, including brother Loyal Lytle. During his career, he was known as The Beast of Stillman's Gym. He was one of the members of the famous Black Murderers' Row, a group of world-class African American welterweights and middleweights who were avoided by most top white fighters of their era and never got the chance to fight for a world title, despite being well-regarded by the boxing community.

The "Chocolate Kid" died on January 26, 1990, 2 days after his 66th birthday.

Professional boxing record

References

External Links

1924 births
Boxers from Texas
1990 deaths
American male boxers
Middleweight boxers
United States Navy personnel of World War II
United States Navy reservists